Events from the year 1691 in the Kingdom of Scotland.

Incumbents 
 Monarch – William II and Mary II
 Secretary of State – John Dalrymple, Master of Stair

Law officers 
 Lord Advocate – John Dalrymple
 Solicitor General for Scotland – ??

Judiciary 
 Lord President of the Court of Session – Lord Stair
 Lord Justice General – Lord Lothian
 Lord Justice Clerk – Lord Cessnock

Events 
 27 August – King William offers the Highland clans a pardon for their part in the Jacobite rising if they agree to pledge allegiance to him before New Year's Day.

Births 
 30 April – Henry Ingram, 7th Viscount of Irvine landowner and politician (died 1761)
 date unknown –
 Thomas Cochrane, 8th Earl of Dundonald, nobleman, army officer and politician (died 1778)
 William M'Culloch, minister (died 1771)
 Philip Miller, botanist (died 1771)

Deaths 
 21 October – Alexander Seton, 1st Viscount of Kingston, cavalier (born 1620)
 date unknown –
 Charles Maitland, 3rd Earl of Lauderdale, peer and statesman (born 1620)

See also 
 Timeline of Scottish history

References 

 
Years of the 17th century in Scotland
1690s in Scotland